Walter Andrew Kiesling (May 27, 1903 – March 2, 1962) was an American football guard and tackle who spent 36 years as a player, coach, and aide with National Football League (NFL) teams. He was posthumously inducted into the Pro Football Hall of Fame in 1966 and was named to the NFL 1920s All-Decade Team in 1969.

A native of Saint Paul, Minnesota, Kiesling played college football at the University of St. Thomas where he was selected as an all-state player in 1923, 1924, and 1925. He then played 13 years as a guard and tackle in the NFL with the Duluth Eskimos (1926–1927),
Pottsville Maroons (1928), Chicago Cardinals (1929–1933), Chicago Bears (1934), Green Bay Packers (1935–1936), and Pittsburgh Pirates (1937–1938). He was a first-team All-Pro in 1929, 1930, and 1932, a second-team All-Pro in 1931, and played for the Packers' 1936 NFL championship team.

Kiesling also spent 25 years as a coach or aide for NFL teams, including seven years as head coach of the Pittsburgh Pirates/Steelers from 1939 to 1942 and 1954 to 1956. He led the Steelers to their first winning season in 1942. He also served as co-coach of the wartime merger teams known as the Steagles in 1943 and Card-Pitt in 1944 and as line coach for the Pirates (1937–1938), Green Bay Packers (1945–1948), and Steelers (1949–1953). He retired from active coaching for health reasons in 1957 but remained an aide to the Steelers coaching staff from 1957 to 1961.

Early years
Kiesling was born in 1903 in Saint Paul, Minnesota. His parents, Wenzel and Barbara Kiesling, were natives of Bohemia who immigrated to the United States in 1890 and 1888, respectively. Kiesling had a younger brother, Edward.  His father worked as a cutter in a leather works and later in a garment factory.

Kiesling attended Cretin High School, a Catholic high school in Saint Paul where he played football as a tackle. He remained in Saint Paul for college, attending the University of St. Thomas. He played football at St. Thomas and was selected as an all-state player for three straight years in 1923, 1924, and 1925. He graduated in 1926 with a bachelor of science degree in mathematics.

Professional football player

Duluth and Pottsville
In the fall of 1926, Kiesling joined the Duluth Eskimos of the National Football League (NFL), appearing in 11 games as a tackle for a team that featured star backs Ernie Nevers and Johnny Blood. He remained in Duluth for the 1927 season, moving to the guard position and appearing in six games.

Kiesling joined the Pottsville Maroons for the 1927 season, starting 10 games at right guard.

Chicago Cardinals
Kiesling next joined the Chicago Cardinals where he played at the left guard position from 1929 to 1933. During his prime years with the Cardinals, he was recognized as one of the leading linemen in the NFL. 
 In 1929, he started 12 games at left guard and was selected as a first-team All-Pro by Collyer's Eye magazine. 
 In 1930, he appeared in 11 games, nine as a starter, and was selected as a first-team All-Pro in 1930 by both Collyer's Eye and the Green Bay Press-Gazette, based on the returns of ballots sent to the league's coaches, club officials, sports writers and officials,
 In 1931, he started nine games at left guards and was selected as a second-team All-Pro by the United Press, the Green Bay Press-Gazette, and Collyer's Eye. 
 In 1932, he started 10 games at left guard and was selected as a first-team All-Pro by the Associated Press.

Kiesling was the Cardinals' heaviest player, ranging from 235 to 260 pounds at six feet, three inches. He was reputed to be "excellent on defense and unusually shifty on offense." He was also known as "a smart guard, a sure tackler despite his bulk and adept at rushing a passer."

During his NFL career, Kiesling lived in Saint Paul in the off-season, operating a cafe and playing as a pitcher and outfielder for a semi-pro baseball team. He also played league baseball in Montana and Canada.

Bears and Packers
In August 1934, George Halas signed Kiesling to a one-year contract with the Chicago Bears. Kiesling appeared in 13 games for the Bears, only five as a starter.

In August 1935, Kiesling signed with the Green Bay Packers. At the time of his signing, the Green Bay Press-Gazette wrote:

Kiesling is one of the most experienced players in the pro grid game. Practically no one gains through his side of the line consistently ... Kiesling never dissipates, and trains in the year around, remaining always in top condition.

Kiesling appeared in 10 games for the Packers in 1935. He also appeared in eight games for the 1936 Green Bay Packers team that won the NFL championship.

Coaching career

Pittsburgh Pirates/Steelers
Kiesling began his coaching career at age 34 during the 1937 season as an assistant coach under Johnny Blood for the Pittsburgh Pirates (renamed the Steelers in 1940). He was also a player for the Pirates during the 1937 and 1938 seasons, appearing in a total of 12 games.  When Blood resigned as head coach after the team lost the first three games of the 1939 season, team owner Art Rooney hired Kiesling as the team's new head coach. Kiesling led the Pirates to a 1–6–1 record in the final eight games of the 1939 season.

Kiesling led the Steelers to a 2–7–2 record during the 1940 season and was replaced by Bert Bell and Aldo Donelli in 1941. Kiesling resumed his role as head coach near the end of the 1941 season, leading the team to a 1–2–1 in the final four games.

Kiesling led the 1942 Steelers to a 7–4 record, the first winning season in club history since the team was formed in 1933. Kiesling's 1942 team was led on the field by rookie halfback Bill Dudley who totaled 1,138 yards of total offense (696 rushing and 438 passing) and also had 576 yards on punt and kickoff returns. Dudley was drafted into Army after the 1942 season.

In 1943, with so many players lost to military service, the Steelers were temporarily merged with the Philadelphia Eagles to form the Steagles.  Kiesling and the Eagles' coach Greasy Neale served as co-coaches of the Steagles. The Steagles compiled a 5–4–1 record.

In 1944, the Steelers were still lacking players due to the war and formed a one-year merger with the Chicago Cardinals, operating under the name Card-Pitt. Kiesling and the Cardinals' coach Phil Handler served as co-coaches. Despite the play of John Grigas, a Cardinals back who led the NFL in 1944 with 1,154 all-purpose yards and 471 kickoff return yards, the Card-Pitt team gave up 32.8 points per game, compiled a 0–10 record, and was outscored by a combined total of 328–108.

Green Bay Packers
In January 1945, Kiesling resigned as the Steelers' coach.  Hours after resigning his position with the Steelers, Kiesling was hired as assistant coach for the Green Bay Packers. He coached the Packers' linemen, and in December 1945, he signed a contract extending his service through the 1947 season. In January 1948, his contract was renewed again through the 1948 season. At the time, Curly Lambeau called Kiesling the top line coach in college or professional football.

Kiesling contracted pneumonia in the winter of 1947 and lost 51 pounds while battling the illness.  In February 1949, Kiesling was released by the Packers, with Lambeau advising Kiesling "in the interests of his health to take a year's vacation from football."

Return to the Steelers
Ignoring Lambeau's advice, Kiesling returned to the Steelers in March 1949 as the line coach. He signed a contract extension with the Steelers in March 1950, and remained as line coach through the 1953 season.

In March 1952, Kiesling was hospitalized with what was described as a "heavy cold". In November 1953 he was hospitalized again with pneumonia.  Starting with his 1947 bout with pneumonia, Kiesling was plagued with respiratory ailments for the rest of his life.

In late August 1954, Joe Bach resigned as the Steelers' head coach after a poor showing by the team in exhibition games, and Kiesling was promoted to head coach. In his third stint as head coach, Kiesling led the Steelers to records of 5–7 in 1954, 4–8 in 1955, and 5–7 in 1956.

Kiesling is often remembered as the coach who released Johnny Unitas, a player widely acclaimed as one of the greatest in NFL history.  The Steelers had selected Unitas, a Pittsburgh native, in the ninth round of the 1955 NFL Draft. Kiesling was satisfied with Jim Finks and Ted Marchibroda as his quarterbacks and was unimpressed by the gangly Unitas. He did not allow Unitas to even play in any exhibition games, and after pre-season camp, Kiesling told Rooney: "Unitas is too dumb. He can't remember plays."

Kiesling's health was declining by the mid-1950s. Steelers' owner Art Rooney considered firing him, but concluded that loyalty outweighed winning.  Rooney reportedly said, "Walt will be my head coach as long as he wants to be, and even if he doesn't want to be." Kiesling's health was poor during the 1956 season, yet he returned for the pre-season in 1957, finally retiring in late August 1957.  He remained an aide to the Steelers' coaching staff until his death.

Kiesling's overall record as an NFL head coach was 30–55–5.

Head coaching record

Family, later years, and honors
Kiesling was married in approximately 1932. At the time of his death, he was married to Irene Andreen Kiesling. No record has been found of Kiesling having any children.

Kiesling suffered from a respiratory ailment that resulted in multiple hospitalizations in his later years. He died in March 1962 at age 58 at Divine Providence Hospital in Pittsburgh. The cause of death was acute bacteremia due to pyelonephritis. He was buried at Christ Our Redeemer Catholic Cemetery in Pittsburgh.

Kiesling was posthumously inducted into the Pro Football Hall of Fame in 1966. In 1969, he was also selected by the Pro Football Hall of Fame as a guard on the NFL 1920s All-Decade Team.

References

External links
 
 
 

1903 births
1962 deaths
American football guards
American football tackles
Chicago Bears players
Chicago Cardinals players
Duluth Eskimos players
Green Bay Packers players
Pittsburgh Pirates (football) players
Pittsburgh Steelers coaches
Pottsville Maroons players
Steagles players and personnel
St. Thomas (Minnesota) Tommies football players
Pro Football Hall of Fame inductees
Players of American football from Saint Paul, Minnesota
Pittsburgh Pirates head coaches
Pittsburgh Steelers head coaches